Sukhodilsk, is a city in Krasnodon Municipality in Luhansk Oblast (region) of Ukraine. Population: , .

Since 2014, Sukhodilsk has been under the effective control of the self-proclaimed by the Luhansk People's Republic.

Demographics 
Native language as of the Ukrainian Census of 2001:
Russian  92.4%
Ukrainian  7.3%
Belarusian  0.1%

References 

Cities in Luhansk Oblast
Cities of district significance in Ukraine
Populated places established in the Russian Empire